Frank C. Archibald (December 31, 1857 – April 9, 1935) was a Vermont attorney and politician who served as Vermont Attorney General for six years.

Biography
Frank Carey Archibald was born in Exeter, New Hampshire on December 31, 1857, the son of Reverend Thomas H. (1821-1900) and Susan W. (Tuck) Archibald (1823-1899).  He graduated from Middlebury Union High School in 1876, and later graduated from the Vermont Academy.  He subsequently studied law, was admitted to the bar in 1886, and became an attorney in Manchester, Vermont in 1886.  He resided in Manchester for the rest of his life, and was the moderator of the Manchester town meeting for nearly 50 years.

Active in politics as a Republican, Archibald served as state's attorney of Bennington County from 1892 to 1894.  He served in the Vermont House of Representatives from 1904 to 1908, and the Vermont Senate from 1910 to 1912.  In 1912 he was an unsuccessful candidate for the Republican nomination for attorney general.  He served again as Bennington County's state's attorney from 1914 to 1918.

In 1918, Archibald was elected Vermont Attorney General. He was reelected in 1920, 1922, and 1924, and served from January 1919 until resigning in May 1925.

In 1920, Archibald was the temporary chairman and keynote speaker at the Vermont Republican State Convention.

After leaving office, Archibald resumed practicing law in Manchester, Vermont.  He served again in the Vermont Senate from 1933 to 1935.  He died in Manchester on April 9, 1935, and was buried at Greenwood Cemetery in Bristol, Vermont.

Family
Archibald was married first to Elizabeth A "Lizzie" Phalen, who died in 1908. Archibald was the stepfather of his wife's two daughters, Eva and Olivia. On October 30, 1912, Archibald married Stella May Chase of Burlington, Vermont. They subsequently divorced, and had no children. Stella May Chase remarried in 1915.

References

Sources

Books

Internet

Newspapers

External links

1857 births
1935 deaths
People from Manchester, Vermont
Vermont lawyers
State's attorneys in Vermont
Republican Party Vermont state senators
Republican Party members of the Vermont House of Representatives
Vermont Attorneys General
Burials in Vermont
Vermont Academy alumni
People from Exeter, New Hampshire